Ilha do Algodão is an island 400 meters away from the historic village of Mambucaba, 6 km northeast of Angra Nuclear Power Plant, in the municipality of Angra dos Reis, southeast of the state of Rio de Janeiro.

History
Records of the time indicate that in 1611, a Baiano (a man from the state of Bahia) would have been granted the island, at the tip of Iperuquara (possibly the one that separates Mambucaba from Praia Vermelha). Also recorded is an island of 200 fathoms in the same locality, granted to Estácio Ferreira in 1619 (possibly Ilha do Algodão).

See also
List of islands of Brazil

References

External links

Atlantic islands of Brazil